Sid Lovett is a Democratic former member of the New Hampshire House of Representatives, representing the Grafton 8th District from 1994–1998, 2000-2002, 2006-2008 and 2012-2014.

External links
New Hampshire House of Representatives - Sid Lovett official NH House website
Project Vote Smart - Representative Sidney 'Sid' Lovett (NH) profile
Follow the Money - Sid Lovett
2006 2004 2002 2000 1998 campaign contributions

Members of the New Hampshire House of Representatives
1928 births
Living people
People from Holderness, New Hampshire
Yale College alumni